Michael Timothy Curry (born June 10, 1956) is an American musician. He has collaborated with singer-songwriter Bryan Adams since the early 1980s, but has also worked with Hall & Oates, Cher, Tina Turner, Alice Cooper, David Bowie, Elvis Costello, Sam Phillips, Tom Waits, Survivor, The Cult and Steve Jones.

Early life
Mickey Curry was born in New Haven, Connecticut. He started playing drums at age 11 under the tutelage of Nick Forte. When he was 13, he and two of his brothers formed a band called The Rack. At age 17, he joined the Scratch Band in Connecticut.

Early career
He played in local bands until around 1980, when he started working in New York studios. While working in Manhattan, he joined the band Tom Dickie and the Desires, managed by Tommy Mottola, manager of Hall & Oates.  Impressed by Curry's work, Mottola asked him to record with Hall & Oates on their album Private Eyes. He subsequently toured with Hall & Oates until 1986.

Bryan Adams
During the period he was playing with Hall & Oates, Curry met producer Bob Clearmountain, who had recently begun working with a young Bryan Adams, and appeared on Adams' second album, You Want It You Got It, and subsequently on nearly all of Adams' subsequent albums. Following his stint with Hall & Oates, Curry began touring full time with Adams.

Other bands
Curry has played for a variety of artists, touring with several of them. In 1987, he was the drummer on Jude Cole's eponymous debut album. In 1988, he served as session drummer for Survivor's album, Too Hot to Sleep.  That same year, he joined hard rock band The Cult, performing on their album Sonic Temple, which featured one of the band's most successful and well-known songs, "Fire Woman". In 1989, Curry played drums on the Ian Hunter/Mick Ronson Album YUI Orta, and in 1991, Mickey Curry joined with The Cult again for another album Ceremony.

Collaborations 
 You Want It You Got It – Bryan Adams (1981)
 Cuts Like a Knife – Bryan Adams (1983)
 Reckless – Bryan Adams (1984)
 Downtown – Marshall Crenshaw (1985)
 Spoiled Girl – Carly Simon (1985)
 Rain Dogs – Tom Waits (1985)
 Rockbird – Debbie Harry (1986)
 Break Every Rule – Tina Turner (1986)
 Into the Fire – Bryan Adams (1987)
 Thunder – Andy Taylor (1987)
 The Turning – Sam Phillips (1987)
 Coming Around Again – Carly Simon (1987)
 The Indescribable Wow – Sam Phillips (1988)
 Back to Avalon – Kenny Loggins (1988)
 Yo Frankie – Dion DiMucci (1989)
 Mystery Girl – Roy Orbison (1989)
 Sonic Temple – The Cult (1989)
 Cruel Inventions – Sam Phillips (1991)
 Love Hurts – Cher (1991)
 Hey Stoopid – Alice Cooper (1991)
 Waking Up the Neighbours – Bryan Adams (1991)
 Life Is Messy – Rodney Crowell (1992)
 Martinis & Bikinis – Sam Phillips (1994)
 18 til I Die – Bryan Adams (1996)
 Falling into You – Céline Dion (1996)
 On a Day Like Today – Bryan Adams (1998)
 Lara Fabian – Lara Fabian (1999)
 Room Service – Bryan Adams (2004)
 11 – Bryan Adams (2008)
 Laughing Down Crying – Daryl Hall (2011)
 Tracks of My Years – Bryan Adams (2014)
 Astral Drive - Astral Drive (Phil Thornalley) (2018)
 Shine a Light – Bryan Adams (2019)
 Orange - Astral Drive (Phil Thornalley) (2021)
 Kasim 2021 - Kasim Sulton (2021)

Musical style and preferences
Mickey Curry exclusively uses Yamaha Drums and has endorsed the brand for many years.
Curry's influences include Ringo Starr, John Bonham, Jeff Porcaro, Steve Gadd, Marvin Gaye and Jim Gordon.

References

External links
 Bryan Adams' official site

1956 births
American rock drummers
The Cult members
Living people
Musicians from New Haven, Connecticut
Hall & Oates members
20th-century American drummers
American male drummers
20th-century American male musicians